WOOW (1340 AM) was a radio station broadcasting a Gospel music format. Licensed to Greenville, North Carolina, the station was last owned by The Minority Voice.

On July 31, 2019, WOOW's license was deleted by the FCC due to being silent over a one-year period.

References

External links
FCC Station Search Details: DWOOW (Facility ID: 65960)
FCC History Cards for WOOW (covering 1947-1980 as WHED / WOOW)

Defunct religious radio stations in the United States
OOW
Radio stations established in 1948
1948 establishments in North Carolina
Defunct radio stations in the United States
Radio stations disestablished in 2019
2019 disestablishments in North Carolina
OOW